A Concise Treatise on the Art of Angling- Confirmed by Actual Experiences and Minute Observations to Which is Added the Compleat Fly-Fisher is a fly fishing book written by Thomas Best, first published in London in 1787.

Synopsis

Although the first part of A Concise Treatise is a general angling work that provided little new information when it was published, the second part of the book--The Complete Fly-Fisher was one of the earliest how-to books on the subject of fly fishing and artificial fly making.  The book proved to be extremely popular and useful, being issued in thirteen editions from 1787 to 1846.

Reviews
 In Ancient Angling Authors (1910) W. J. Turrell notes:
A Concise Treatise on the Art of Angling. . . . By Thomas Best, Gent. Late of his Majesty's Drawing Room in the Tower, London, appeared in 1787. Thirteen editions of this work were published;, to the tenth and eleventh editions the greater part of Nobbes' Compleat Troller was added. This book, though it contains nothing strikingly original, is a thoroughly practical treatise on the
art of angling...
 In Notable Angling Literature (1945) James Robb notes about Best and A Concise Treatise:
He makes mention of the multiplying reel, the first time we hear of it, but evidently not unknown before his day. In the second part of the book, which has the special title The Complete Fly-fisher, he describes the dressing of many flies and their killing powers.  Upon the whole, it is a practical and sensible work.

Contents
(From the 9th Edition)
 Part I - Art of Angling
 Chapter I - A Description of Fishes, according to Natural History with the best methods of Breeding, mid Feeding Carp, &c
 Chapter II - The best Manner of Making and Chasing Rods, Lines, Hooks, &c
 Chapter III - The general Baits used in Angling, where found, and how preserved.
 Chapter IV - Of natural Fly-Fishing, with a Description of Flies generally used, and a choice collection of Rules and Hints to be observed in Angling
 Chapter V - A Description of the Fish generally angled for in England and Wales, with the proper Times and Seasons, to fish for them; their peculiar haunts, spawning Time, and most killing, Baits
 Chapter VI - The most scientific Method of making Fish-Ponds, Stews, &c.; to which are added, several Arcana in the Art of Angling
 Part II - The Complete Fly Fisher: or Everyman his own fly-maker
 Chapter I - Observations concerning artificial Fly-angling, with proper Directions for the Angler's Rods, Lines, &c.
 Chapter II - A List of the Materials necessary for an Angler to have, and the best Method to make the Palmer and May Fly.
 Chapter III - The Names and the best Manner of dubbing the different Artificial Flies, which are generally known and will kill Fish on any Water from the beginning of March to the end of September
 Chapter IV - A second List of very killing Flies
 Chapter V - The best Rules for Artificial Fly-fishing
 Chapter VI - Of the principal Rivers in England, and particularly of the Thames
 Chapter VII - Of the Game Laws relative to Angling
 Chapter VIII - Prognostics of the Weather, independent of the Barometer, extracted from the best Authorities
 Chapter IX - Rules to Judge of the Barometer

Other editions
From Bibliotheca Piscatoria, T. Westwood & T. Satchell (1883)

 
 
 
 
 
 
 
 
 
 
 
 

From Antiquarian Booksellers Online

Further reading

See also
 Bibliography of fly fishing

External links
 Online Version Internet Archive

Notes

1787 non-fiction books
Angling literature
Fly fishing literature
British books
Recreational fishing in the United Kingdom
Treatises